The Hangzhou dialect (Rhangzei Rhwa) is spoken in the city of Hangzhou, China and its immediate suburbs, but excluding areas further away from Hangzhou such as Xiāoshān (蕭山) and Yúháng (余杭) (both originally county-level cities and now the districts within Hangzhou City). Its number of speakers has been estimated to be about 1.2 to 1.5 million. It is a dialect of Wu, one of the Chinese varieties. 

The Hangzhou dialect is of immense interest to Chinese historical phonologists and dialectologists because phonologically, it exhibits extensive similarities with the other Wu dialects; however, grammatically and lexically, it shows many Mandarin tendencies. Although the Hangzhou dialect has the basic characteristics of the Wu language, several waves of migration from the north, represented by the southward relocation of the ruling centre of Song dynasty, have caused the local language system to undergo great changes and gradually take on a special character in Jiangnan region. 

The Hangzhou dialect is classified as a "developing" language, with a rating of 5 on the Expanded Graded Intergenerational Disruption Scale (EGIDS), meaning it is still in vigorous use, but its written form are neither sustainable, nor widespread.

Classification
The Hangzhou dialect is classified under Wu Chinese, although some western linguists claim Hangzhou is a Mandarin Chinese language.

Richard VanNess Simmons, a professor of Chinese at Rutgers University in New Jersey, United States, claims that the Hangzhou dialect, rather than being Wu as it was classified by Yuen Ren Chao, is a Mandarin variant closely related to Jianghuai Mandarin. The Hangzhou dialect is still classified under Wu. Chao had developed a "Common Wu Syllabary" for the Wu dialects. Simmons claimed that had Chao compared the Hangzhou dialect to the Wu syllabary and Jianghuai Mandarin, he would have found more similarities to Jianghuai. Jianghuai Mandarin shares an "old literary layer" as a stratum with southern languages like Min Nan, Hakka, Gan and Hangzhou dialects, which it does not share with Northern Mandarin. Sino-Vietnamese also shares some of these characteristics. The stratum in Min Nan specifically consist of Zeng group and Geng group's "n" and "t" finals when an "i" initial is present.

John H. McWhorter claimed that the Hangzhou dialect was categorized as a Wu dialect because seven tones are present in Hangzhou, which is significantly more than the typical number of tones found in northern Mandarin dialects, which is four.

Geographic distribution

It stretches from yuhang xiasha in the east to the Qiangtang River in the south. A growing number of Hangzhounese speakers is emerging overseas in New York City, United States.

The Hangzhou dialect is mainly spoken in the urban area in Hangzhou, including the urban area of Gongshu district, Shangcheng district, Xiacheng district, the urban area of Jianggan district, the urban area and seven villages of Xihu district, and part of Binjiang district.

Phonology

Vowels

Initials

Finals

Syllabic continuants:     

Notes:
The Hangzhou dialect has a rare "apical glide"  which is an allophone of  after sibilant initials.
 is pronounced  before rounded vowels.
Contrast can be found to justify most of these vowels as distinct phonemes in Hangzhou dialect. /i, y/ and /ï, ÿ/, however, are in complementary distribution. /ï/ and /ÿ/ are only found following sibilants /ts, ts', dz, s/ and /z/, where /i/ and /y/ does not.

Middle Chinese  rimes have become glottal stops, .

Phonological features

Contrast

In HZD, bilabial fricatives [ɸ] and [β] are allophone of bilabial fricatives /f/ and /v/ after [u].

Vowels /y/ and /ʏ/ are contrastive, representing different characters with different meaning.

Glottalization of initial nasals and laterals

Some initial nasals and laterals are glottalized.

Syllable Patterns and Tones
In Hangzhou dialect (hereafter: HZD), phonetic symbol is divided into onsets and rhymes using onset-rhyme model. Onsets are simple and not mandatory, vowels can appear initially if [m], [n] and [əl] appear in the rhyme. HZD does not allow codas, but nasals are permitted at the end of the syllable, if they are part of the complex nucleus.

The old Hangzhou dialect has 53 rhymes</ref>.

The Hangzhou tonal system is similar to that of the Suzhou dialect, in that some words with shàng tone in Middle Chinese have merged with the yīn qù tone. Since the tone split dating from Middle Chinese still depends on the voicing of the initial consonant, these constitute just three phonemic tones: pin, shang, and qu.  (Ru syllables are phonemically toneless.)

In HZD, the tones will change not only because of the nearby tones, but also due to the phrase structures.

Vocabulary
Time
gemore (箇卯) – now
deimore (头卯) – just now
yalidei (夜里头) – at night
rizong (日中) – at noon
relidei (日里头) – in the day
zaogedei (早间头) – in the morning
yadaobian (夜到边) – in the evening

Expression of person, categorized by generation
agong (阿公) – mother's father
abo (阿婆) – mother's mother
diadia (爷爷) – father's father
nene (奶奶) – father's mother
popo (婆婆) – grandfather's sister
xiaodiadia (小爷爷) – grandfather's sister's husband

aba (阿爸)/baba (爸爸) – papa
muma (姆妈)/mama (妈妈) – mom
bobo (伯伯) – father's brother
damuma (大姆妈) – wife of father's oldest brother
xiaoboubou (小伯伯) – father's younger brother
senniang (婶娘) – wife of father's little brother
ayi (阿姨) / gugu (姑姑) – father's sister
guvu (姑夫) – father's sister's husband
niangjiu (娘舅)/ajiu (阿舅)/jiujiu (舅舅) – mother's brother
jiumu (舅妈) – wife of mother's brother
zangren (丈人) – wife's father
zangmuniang (丈母娘) – wife's mother
yiniang (姨娘) – mother's sister
ganyi (干姨) – mother's sister's husband

agou (阿哥) – elder brother
adi (阿弟) – little brother
ajie (阿姐) – elder sister
amei (阿妹) – little sister
biaogou/biaodi (表哥/表弟) – male older/younger cousin who does not share surname
biaojie/biaomei (表姐/表妹) – female older/younger cousin who does not share surname
danggou/dangdi (堂哥/堂弟) – male older/younger cousin who shares the same surname
dangjie/dangmei (堂姐/堂妹) – female older/younger cousin who shares the same surname

xiaoya'er (小伢儿) – child

History
The most important event to have impacted Hangzhou's dialect was the city's establishment as Lin'an, the capital of the Southern Song Dynasty. When the Northern Song Dynasty was conquered by the Jin Dynasty in 1127, large numbers of northern refugees fled to what is now Hangzhou, speaking predominantly Mandarin of the Henan variety. Within 30 years, contemporary accounts record that immigrants outnumbered natives in Hangzhou. This resulted in Mandarin influences in the pronunciation, lexicon and grammar of the Hangzhou dialect.

Further influence by Mandarin occurred after the overthrow of the Qing Dynasty in 1912. The local Manchu garrisons were dissolved, adding significant numbers of the Beijing dialect Mandarin speakers to the population.

Because of the frequent commerce and intercourse between Hangzhou and Shaoxing, the Hangzhou dialect is also influenced by the Shaoxing dialect.

In recent years, with the standardization of Mandarin, the vitality of the Hangzhou dialect is decreasing. As Kandrysawtz concluded, the Hangzhou dialect is spoken in fewer places and by fewer people, especially the younger generation. Some people also hold the attitude that the Hangzhou dialect is not appropriate in official occasions.

See also
Wu Chinese
Shanghainese
Suzhounese
Ningbonese
List of varieties of Chinese

References

External links
Wu Association

Wu Chinese
Culture in Hangzhou